Elizabeth Josephine Brawley Hughes (December 22, 1839 – March 1926) was an advocate of women's rights in the United States West region.

Biography
Elizabeth Josephine Brawley (she dropped her first name later in life) was born on a farm near Meadville, Pennsylvania, on December 22, 1839, to John R. Brawley and Sarah Haskins. After graduating from Edinboro State Normal School, she was a teacher for two years in Pennsylvania public schools.

While a student at Edinboro, she met Louis C. Hughes, whom she married in 1868. Because of a Civil War wound, Louis moved to the Arizona Territory in 1871 and Josephine followed in 1872 with their first child, Gertrude. Josephine and the baby traveled first by rail to San Francisco, then by boat to San Diego, and finally by stagecoach to Tucson. During the trip, Hughes carried a loaded rifle in one arm and her infant daughter in the other. According to a biography by Louise Boehringer in the January 1930 edition of the Arizona Historical Review, at the time of Josephine's arrival, "Only two other (Eastern) homemakers were established in Tucson when the young wife and mother reached her destination–Mrs. Charles Lord (wife of Dr. Lord) and Mrs. C. Scott (wife of Judge C. Scott)."

The family lived in an adobe home like the rest of "The Old Pueblo" (a nickname for Tucson), but it did contain the town's first cistern. Hughes taught in the first public school for girls in Tucson.  She also worked in the office of her husband's newspaper, the Arizona Star. 

In 1893, Louis was appointed territorial governor by President Grover Cleveland. Their son, John T., later served in the first state Senate.

The Arizona State Capitol building in Phoenix has a bronze plaque in its rotunda in Josephine's honor, placed December 16, 1926.

Activism
Hughes was president of the Arizona Women's Christian Temperance Association.  The Arizona WCTU, like the national WCTU, believed that women needed the right to vote so that they could regulate alcohol and other forms of vice in their  communities.  In 1890, Hughes helped to found the first woman suffrage organization in Arizona Territory.  Despite her efforts, Arizona's women did not gain the right to vote until 1912.

Accomplishments
 Helped establish the first public girls' school in the Southwest.
 Was the first woman public school teacher in Arizona.
 Joined other women to raise funds for the first Protestant church in Arizona.
 Helped found the Woman's Christian Temperance Union (WCTU) in Arizona.
 Helped found the women's suffrage movement in Arizona.
 Helped to manage and operate the Arizona Daily Star newspaper.

See also
 National American Woman Suffrage Association
 Sallie Davis Hayden
 Frances Willard Munds

References

Further reading

External links
 Josephine Brawley Hughes, Arizona Women's Hall of Fame

1839 births
1926 deaths
American temperance activists
Arizona pioneers
People from Tucson, Arizona